Hill Top is a former railway station which was located on the Picton – Mittagong loop railway line. It served the small town of Hill Top, a Northern Village of the Southern Highlands  of New South Wales, Australia.

History
The station opened on 5 December 1878 as Big Hill Upper Siding, was renamed Colo in 1881 and became Hill Top on 1 May 1883. The station along with the Loop Line was closed in 1978.

The station has been almost demolished, the platform building is gone and the platform is being restored. The loop line from Picton to Colo Vale is in transition to reopen. Upgrades are in progress.

See also

 List of disused railway stations in New South Wales

References

External links

Disused regional railway stations in New South Wales
Railway stations in Australia opened in 1878
Railway stations closed in 1978
Main Southern railway line, New South Wales
Southern Highlands (New South Wales)